The 1909 Copa de Honor Cousenier was the final match to decide the winner of the Copa de Honor Cousenier, the 5th. edition of the international competition organised by the Argentine and Uruguayan Associations together. The final was contested by Uruguayan side CURCC and Argentine club San Isidro. 

The match was held in the Estadio Gran Parque Central in Montevideo, on October 17, 1909. CURCC beat San Isidro 4–2, winning its first Copa Cousenier trophy.

Qualified teams 

Note

Match details 

|

References

c
c
1909 in Argentine football
1909 in Uruguayan football